Cross Lanes is a hamlet in the parish of Cury, Cornwall, England, UK. According to the Post Office the population at the 2011 census fell in the civil parish of Mawgan-in-Meneage.

Cross Lanes lies within the Cornwall Area of Outstanding Natural Beauty (AONB).

References

Hamlets in Cornwall